Kulamandan Khand 'Shah' was the first king of Kaski district and ancestor of the great king Prithivi Narayan Shah of Nepal. 

Kulamandan conquered Kaski Kingdom and received the title of "Shah". His son Yasho Brahma Shah succeeded him as the King of Lamjung and Kaski. His eldest son Narhari Shah became ruler of Lamjung while the second son ruled over Kaski. His youngest son, Dravya Shah ruled the Kingdom of Gorkha. 

His successors are as follows:

References 

Kingdom of Nepal